Maanthrikam is a 1995 Indian Malayalam-language action comedy film produced and directed by Thampi Kannanthanam and written by Babu Pallassery. It stars Mohanlal, Jagadish, Priya Raman, Raghuvaran, and Rajan P. Dev. Filmed by Saloo George and edited by A. Sreekar Prasad; S. P. Venkatesh provided the music. The film was dubbed in Tamil as Raanuvam. It marked the Malayalam debut of actress Vineetha.

Premise 
A Senior Scientist of Missile Technology designs a state of the art missile "Samhaara"and he is abducted by a terrorist group with family. A military officer and his assistant are entrusted with the mission to rescue the scientist. They join a gypsy performing art group in disguise and reach a fictitious town and a girl get attracted to the officer. He get involved with the sister of the assistant of terrorist group leader to execute the mission. In a twist it is revealed that the main girl dancer of the gypsy group is an officer appointed by military chief to track officer, who is suspected of double crossing. Finally every thing get resolved and the scientist is rescued unhurt with safety of Samhaara know-how and the hero takes his lady love with him. Mohanlal simply excels as a comedian, lover, military man, magician and dancer with 3 heroines.

Cast 
 Mohanlal as Alby / Maj. Stephen Ronald, Military Intelligence 
 Jagadish as Jobi D'Costa / Subedar Teddy Lopez, Military Intelligence
 Priya Raman as Betty Fernadez
 Hemanth Ravan as Gonsalves
 Vineetha as Menaka/Lt. Diana, Military Intelligence
 Mitra Joshi as Catherine
 Rajan P. Dev as Antonio
 Raghuvaran as Dr. Abdul Rahiman, scientist
 Vaishnavi as Shakeela Abdul Rahman
 Madhupal as Willy
 Krishnakumar as Douglas
 Sreenath as Col. Raveendran
 Ravi Menon as Father Thaliyath
 Ajith Kollam as Freddy
 Santhosh as Beeran
 Vinayakan as Michael Jackson imitator
 Maria gorettiz

Production
Lal Jose was the associate director of Thampi Kannanthanam in the film. Madras (now Chennai) was a filming location. Maanthrikam marked the film debut of Vinayakan, who appeared as a member of a gypsy dance group, he apparently imitates and wears the attire of Michael Jackson. For the role, Vinayakan was referred to Kannanthanam by Lal Jose, who spotted him during a dance performance in Kochi. Made on a budget of 3 crores, major locations of the movie were MGR Film City, Kishkinda Water Park, Chidambaram and Pichavaram. The magic sequences which Mohanlal performed was taught by magician R. K. Malayath.

Soundtrack 
S. P. Venkatesh composed the music for the movie for which the lyrics were written by O. N. V. Kurup. The songs were distributed by Ankit Audios.

Reception
Mohanlal had expressed doubts about the film doing well at the box office due to the unworldly stunts performed in the film. However, Kannanthanam assured him that the film would be a hit. Maanthrikam was one of the highest-grossing Malayalam films of that year.

References

External links
 

1990s Malayalam-language films
1995 films
Indian action comedy films
Indian Army in films
Films shot in Chennai
Films directed by Thampi Kannanthanam
1995 action films